David Babunski (born 1 March 1994) is a Macedonian footballer who plays as an attacking midfielder for Hungarian club Mezőkövesd.

A product of FC Barcelona's La Masia, he played for their reserves before transferring to Red Star Belgrade in January 2016, winning the Serbian SuperLiga in his first season. He later played in Japan, Romania and Hungary.

Babunski has been capped by the Macedonia football team at international level, making his senior debut in 2013.

Club career

Barcelona
Born in Skopje, Babunski joined FC Barcelona's La Masia in 2006, aged 12, after starring at UDA Gramenet. In December 2011, he was elected Macedonian Young Sportsperson of the Year, ahead of karatekas Aziz Ismail and Berat Jakupi.

Babunski was promoted to the reserves in June 2013, and made his professional debut on 24 August, coming on as a second-half substitute in a 2–1 home win against CD Lugo in the Segunda División championship. He scored his first goal on 31 May 2014, netting a last-minute winner in a 4–3 home success over AD Alcorcón.

He played 16 games in 2014–15, a campaign which ended with relegation to Segunda División B. On 28 February 2015, as a half-time substitute for Juan Cámara, he received a straight red card in a 2–4 loss to RCD Mallorca at the Mini Estadi.

After a decade in the ranks of Barcelona, Babunski left by mutual consent in January 2016.

Red Star Belgrade
Babunski signed a -year deal with Red Star Belgrade on 28 January 2016. He made his Serbian SuperLiga debut on 20 February, replacing Aleksandar Katai for the final 11 minutes of a 2–1 home win over FK Mladost Lučani, and played five more matches as the team won their 27th title.

Japan
On 30 January 2017, Babunski signed for Japanese club Yokohama F. Marinos, as their second purchase from Red Star that month after that of Hugo Vieira. He made his debut in the J1 League on 25 February, scoring the first goal of a 3–2 home win over Urawa Red Diamonds in the season opener.

In August 2018, Babunski signed for Omiya Ardija, in the same league.

Romania
On 2 March 2020, Babunski signed a one-and-a-half year contract with Romanian club FC Botoșani. On 29 December, he was released from the club by mutual consent.

On 11 January 2021, Babunski joined FC Viitorul Constanța also of Liga I on a two-and-half-year contract.

Hungary
On 8 July 2021, Babunski signed a two-year deal with Hungarian club Debreceni VSC.

In the summer of 2022, Debreceni VSC terminated his contract by mutual consent. On 20 September 2022, Babunski signed with Mezőkövesd, and in January 2023 signed a new two-and-a-half-year contract with the club.

International career
A regular in all of Macedonia's youth squads, Babunski scored his first goal for the under-21 team on 25 May 2012, netting his side's second in a 2–2 friendly draw against Albania.

In August 2013 he was called up by the main squad for a friendly against Bulgaria. Babunski made his debut for the side on the 14th, playing the last 31 minutes of the 2–0 home win in Skopje.

International stats

Personal life
Babunski's father, Boban, was also a footballer, and played in several countries including Spain. His younger brother, Dorian, is also a footballer who plays as a forward, and the pair played together at Debrecen. Babunski's great-great-grandfather was Jovan Babunski, a Serbian Chetnik vojvoda, while he has stated that he is proud of being Jovan Babunski's descendant.

Babunski is a vocal supporter of the human rights of refugees. He, his brother, and four friends spent Christmas 2015 at a refugee camp in Gevgelija, a Macedonian town on the Greek border and part of the Balkan route for displaced people seeking accommodation in the West.

Career statistics

Club

Honours
Red Star Belgrade
SuperLiga: 2015–16

References

External links

Profile at MacedonianFootball.com 
Profile at Yokohama F. Marinos

1994 births
Living people
Footballers from Skopje
Macedonian people of Serbian descent
Association football midfielders
Macedonian footballers
North Macedonia under-21 international footballers
North Macedonia international footballers
FC Barcelona Atlètic players
Red Star Belgrade footballers
Yokohama F. Marinos players
Omiya Ardija players
FC Botoșani players
FC Viitorul Constanța players
Debreceni VSC players
Mezőkövesdi SE footballers
Segunda División players
Segunda División B players
Serbian SuperLiga players
J1 League players
J2 League players
Liga I players
Nemzeti Bajnokság I players
Macedonian expatriate footballers
Expatriate footballers in Spain
Macedonian expatriate sportspeople in Spain
Expatriate footballers in Serbia
Macedonian expatriate sportspeople in Serbia
Expatriate footballers in Japan
Macedonian expatriate sportspeople in Japan
Expatriate footballers in Romania
Macedonian expatriate sportspeople in Romania
Expatriate footballers in Hungary
Macedonian expatriate sportspeople in Hungary